Saudi Mosque is a mosque in Nouakchott, Mauritania. It is located southwest of the Presidential Palace and immediately west of the Chamber of Commerce.
The mosque was built by Saudi money.

For several decades, Bouddah Ould Bousseyri had been imam of the Saudi Mosque, he was a close associate of the Mauritanian regime and a supporter of Sunni Islam and a very influential figure in the apolitical Islamist camp.
The current imam, Ahmedou Ould Lemrabet, is a thinker of politicised salafism and a supporter of state authority.

See also
  Lists of mosques 
  List of mosques in Africa
  List of mosques in Egypt

References

Mosques in Mauritania
Buildings and structures in Nouakchott
Saudi Arabian diaspora